Sosti can refer to the following places:
in Greece:
Sosti, Elis, a village in Elis 
Sostis, a village and a municipal unit in the Rhodope regional unit
Agios Sostis, a village in Messenia
Agios Sostis, Phthiotis, a village in the municipal unit Spercheiada, Phthiotis
Agios Sostis, a cape in Preveza (regional unit)
San Sosti, a commune in the province of Cosenza, Italy